Tsarevna Yevdokia Alekseyevna (17 February 1650 - 10 May 1712) was the eldest daughter of Tsar Alexis of Russia and Maria Miloslavskaya, sister of Tsar Feodor III of Russia and Tsar Ivan V of Russia and half-sister of Tsar Peter the Great.

Like many other Tsarevnas of her time, Yevdokia was educated and literate. She lived a secluded life and little is known about her earlier years. She could be described as mild, reserved and studious, and devoted to serving her family and kingdom. She was passionate about her education, and a very bright student.

As was required of her, she never married. Instead she served her kingdom and Orthodoxy with compassion and grace. She has no known offspring, and it can be assumed that she served in a convent for some time. She died with not much of a legacy behind her, and her name is not remembered often.

References

Григорян В. Г. Романовы. Биографический справочник. — М.:АСТ,2007.

1650 births
1712 deaths
Russian tsarevnas
House of Romanov
Royalty from Moscow
18th-century people from the Russian Empire
17th-century Russian women
18th-century women from the Russian Empire
Children of Alexis of Russia